O.C. Smith at Home is the third studio LP album by O. C. Smith, originally released in 1969.

Track listing

Charts

References

1969 albums